This is a list of Internally displaced persons (IDP) camps in Nigeria.

Abuja
There are four IDP camps in Abuja: 
 Lugbe IDP Camp
 Area One IDP Camp 
 New Kuchingoro IDP Camp
 Kuje IDP Camp

Lagos
 Internally Displaced Person Camp in Lagos

Borno State

 Bakassi IDP camp in Maiduguri

References

Internally displaced persons
Nigeria-related lists